Group G of the 2022 FIFA World Cup took place from 24 November to 2 December 2022. The group consisted of Brazil, Serbia, Switzerland and Cameroon. The top two teams, Brazil and Switzerland, advanced to the round of 16. This was unprecedented in World Cup history as Brazil won the group despite scoring fewer goals than each of their opponents. Brazil, Serbia and Switzerland also played in Group E at the previous FIFA World Cup.

Teams

Notes

Standings

In the round of 16:
 The winners of Group G, Brazil, advanced to play the runners-up of Group H, South Korea.
 The runners-up of Group G, Switzerland, advanced to play the winners of Group H, Portugal.

Matches
All times listed are local, AST (UTC+3).

Switzerland vs Cameroon
The two teams had never met before.

After a goalless first half, Breel Embolo scored three minutes into the second half with a finish from six yards out after a cross from Xherdan Shaqiri on the right. Embolo did not celebrate the goal in respect to being born in Cameroon; he moved to Switzerland when he was six years old.

Brazil vs Serbia
The teams had met once in the World Cup, in Brazil's 2–0 group stage victory in 2018. With Serbia playing as Yugoslavia, the two teams had met 18 times, including four times at the FIFA World Cup group stages, in 1930, 1950, 1954 and 1974, with one victory for each and two draws.

After a goalless first half, Richarlison opened the scoring for Brazil in the 62nd minute, when he followed up to finish after Serbian goalkeeper Vanja Milinković-Savić saved Vinícius Júnior's low shot from the left, with Neymar initially creating the chance. Richarlison made it 2–0 eleven minutes later when he controlled the ball from Vinícius Júnior before finishing to the left of the net with an over the shoulder acrobatic right-foot kick. Casemiro hit the woodwork and Fred also had a shot saved with Brazil running out comfortable 2–0 winners.

Cameroon vs Serbia
The two teams had faced each other once in a 2010 friendly game, in which Serbia won 4–3.

Jean-Charles Castelletto put Cameroon into the lead in the 29th minute, when he finished from close range after a corner. In first-half stoppage time Strahinja Pavlović made it 1–1 with a header before Sergej Milinković-Savić put Serbia ahead before half-time with a low finish to the corner. Eight minutes into the second half, Aleksandar Mitrović put Serbia 3–1 up with a low finish after a passing move. Vincent Aboubakar scooped the ball over Vanja Milinković-Savić to score Cameroon's second goal in the 63rd minute, and Eric Maxim Choupo-Moting equalized three minutes later with a low shot after a pass from the right by Aboubakar. The match finished in an entertaining 3–3 draw.

Brazil vs Switzerland
The teams had met nine times including twice in the World Cup both in group stage matches ending in draws: 2–2 in 1950 and 1–1 in 2018.

Brazil started the game without the injured Neymar, who was ruled out for the remainder of the group stage. The only goal of the game was scored by Casemiro in the 83rd minute, when his deflected right foot shot from inside the penalty area struck the right corner of the net.

Serbia vs Switzerland

The teams had met once, in Switzerland's 2–1 group stage victory at the 2018 FIFA World Cup. With Serbia playing as Yugoslavia, the two teams met 13 times, including in the 1950 FIFA World Cup group stage, a 3–0 victory for Yugoslavia.

Serbia failed to secure a single win along and was eliminated in the group stage of the World Cup for a fourth consecutive time.

Cameroon vs Brazil
The two teams had met six times including twice in the World Cup, both in the group, stage matches ending in victories for Brazil: 3–0 in 1994 and 4–1 in 2014.

In the second minute of the nine minutes added on, Cameroon scored to win the game when Vincent Aboubakar ran into the penalty area to head low to the right corner of the net from six yards out after a cross from the right by Jerome Ngom Mbekeli.
Aboubakar celebrated the goal by removing his shirt, receiving a second yellow card and was therefore sent off.
Despite Brazil's loss, Brazil clinched their top position into the knockout stage. Cameroon became the first African team to defeat Brazil at a World Cup, while this win also became Cameroon's first-ever World Cup win since 2002. As this was the last match of the group stage, Brazil's loss also meant that no teams finished the group stage with a 100% winning record for the first time since 1994.

Discipline
Fair play points would have been used as tiebreakers if the overall and head-to-head records of teams were tied. These were calculated based on yellow and red cards received in all group matches as follows:
first yellow card: −1 point;
indirect red card (second yellow card): −3 points;
direct red card: −4 points;
yellow card and direct red card: −5 points;

Only one of the above deductions was applied to a player in a single match.

Notes

References

External links

 

2022 FIFA World Cup
Brazil at the 2022 FIFA World Cup
Serbia at the 2022 FIFA World Cup
Switzerland at the 2022 FIFA World Cup
Cameroon at the 2022 FIFA World Cup